Moonlight is a Polish gothic/progressive metal band.

Discography

Studio albums

Live albums

Video albums

Music videos

References

Polish gothic metal musical groups
Polish alternative rock groups
Musical groups established in 1991
Metal Mind Productions artists
1991 establishments in Poland